Catch and Kill: The Podcast Tapes is an American documentary television miniseries, directed and produced by Randy Barbato and Fenton Bailey. It follows Ronan Farrow, as he conducts interviews with whistleblowers, victims, private investigators and sources for his book Catch and Kill.  It consists of 6-episodes and premiered on July 12, 2021, on HBO.

Plot
The series follows Ronan Farrow as he conducts interviews with whistleblowers, victims, private investigators, and other sources for his book Catch and Kill in regard to the Harvey Weinstein sexual abuse cases.

Episodes

Production
In January 2018, Ronan Farrow signed a deal with HBO to produce and star in various documentary specials for the network. HBO filmed Farrow and guests of his podcast Catch and Kill with the idea of turning it into a documentary series at some point. Production on the series took place during the COVID-19 pandemic, with HBO reaching out to Fenton Bailey and Randy Barbato about taking the filmed interviews and turning into a series.

In June 2021, it was announced Farrow would star and executive produce the series, with Fenton Bailey and Randy Barbato directing and producing under their World of Wonder banner.

Reception
Review aggregator Rotten Tomatoes reported an approval rating of 88% based on 16 critic reviews, with an average rating of 6.72/10. Metacritic, which uses a weighted average, assigned a score of 74 out of 100 based on 7 critics, indicating "generally favorable reviews".

References

External links
 
 

2021 American television series debuts
2021 American television series endings
2020s American documentary television series
English-language television shows
HBO original programming
HBO documentary films
Television shows based on podcasts
Television series by World of Wonder (company)
Catch and Kill